The second season of Mask Singer: Adivina quién canta premiered on 24 May 2021, and lasted for 9 episodes. On 29 July 2021, Erizo (flamenco dancer Joaquín Cortés) was declared the winner.

Panelists and host
Arturo Valls returned as the show's host, as well film directors Javier Calvo, Javier Ambrossi, and comedian José Mota returned to the panel of 'investigators'. They were joined by season 1 winner Paz Vega, who replaced Malú as a regular panelist.

Contestants

Virtual mask and guests

(*) Dama Centella will only appear in the finale, where her identity will be revealed, as it is a digital mask whose real identity can only be guessed through the clues that the official website of the program gives each week in its own format, Tras la pista de Dama Centella (On the Trail of Dama Centella).

Episodes

Week 1 (24 May)

Week 2 (31 May)

Week 3 (9 June)

Week 4 (16 June)
 Ana Obregón appeared as a guest investigator.
 Group number: "Can't Stop the Feeling!" by Justin Timberlake

Week 5 (23 June)
 Chenoa appeared as a guest investigator.
 Group number: "Fiesta" by Raffaella Carrà

Week 6 (30 June)

 Nuria Roca appeared as a guest investigator.
 Group number: "Madre Tierra (Oye)" by Chayanne

Week 7 (14 July)

Week 8 (21 July)

Week 9 (29 July)

Ratings

Notes

References

2021 Spanish television seasons
Masked Singer